Fencing events were contested at the 1993 Summer Universiade in Buffalo, New York, USA.

Medal overview

Men's events

Women's events

Medal table

References
 
 Results of The 17th Universiade '93 Buffalo: Fencing.

1993 Summer Universiade
Universiade
Fencing at the Summer Universiade
International fencing competitions hosted by the United States